Aleksandar Radukić (born 22 May 1991) is a Bosnian professional basketball player for Nová Huť Ostrava of the Czech NBL.

Playing career 
Radukić has signed for Igokea on 20 March 2012, having spent the first part of the 2011–12 season at Servitum Gradiška. He started playing professional basketball at Borac Nektar.

On 23 December 2020, Radukić signed for Borac Banja Luka. He left Borac in August 2021 to sign with Nová Huť Ostrava.

References

External links 
 Profile at abaliga.com
 Profile at eurobasket.com

1991 births
Living people
ABA League players
BK Inter Bratislava players
Bosnia and Herzegovina expatriate basketball people in Romania 
Bosnia and Herzegovina men's basketball players
SCM U Craiova (basketball) players
KK Bosna Royal players
KK Igokea players
OKK Borac players
MBK Handlová players
Power forwards (basketball)
People from Nova Gradiška
Serbs of Bosnia and Herzegovina